In molecular biology, Highly Up-regulated in Liver Cancer (non-protein coding), also known as HULC, is a long non-coding RNA. It was first identified in hepatocellular carcinoma, and is also expressed in colorectal carcinomas that metastasise to the liver. It may have a role in the post-transcriptional regulation of gene expression. It downregulates the expression of several microRNAs, including miR-372.  Expression of HULC is upregulated by CREB, there is a CREB-binding site in the promoter of HULC. miR-372 represses translation of the kinase PRKACB, so downregulation of miR-372 leads to increased levels of PRKACB. PRKACB activates CREB by phosphorylation, therefore leading to increased expression of HULC.

See also 
 Long noncoding RNA

References

Further reading 
 

Non-coding RNA